Harriet Jones (born 27 May 1997) is a Welsh swimmer. She competed in the women's 100 metre butterfly event at the 2020 European Aquatics Championships, in Budapest, Hungary, reaching the semi-finals.

Jones who became the 50m Butterfly Welsh record holder in 2021 and she won the 100m Butterfly Olympic trial and she was named as a member of the British team to go to the postponed 2020 Olympics in April.

References

External links
 

1997 births
Living people
Welsh female swimmers
British female butterfly swimmers
Swimmers at the 2018 Commonwealth Games
Commonwealth Games competitors for Wales
European Aquatics Championships medalists in swimming
Swimmers at the 2020 Summer Olympics
Olympic swimmers of Great Britain
Swimmers at the 2022 Commonwealth Games
20th-century Welsh women
21st-century Welsh women
Sportspeople from Cardiff